Harold Elijah Bower (March 25, 1912 – November 13, 1992), sometimes incorrectly named Bowers, was an American professional basketball player. He played for the Cincinnati Comellos in the National Basketball League for two games during the 1937–38 season and averaged 4.5 points per game.

References

1912 births
1992 deaths
American men's basketball players
Basketball players from Indiana
Cincinnati Comellos players
Earlham Quakers football players
Earlham Quakers men's basketball players
Guards (basketball)
People from Seymour, Indiana